Trybukhivtsi may refer to:

Trybukhivtsi, Trybukhivtsi rural hromada, Chortkiv Raion, Ternopil Oblast, Ukraine
Trybukhivtsi, Husiatyn settlement hromada, Chortkiv Raion, Ternopil Oblast, Ukraine
, Second Polish Republic

See also
, Lviv Oblast, Ukraine